Jumnos is a genus of beetles belonging to the family Scarabaeidae.

Species
 Jumnos ferroiminettiique Antoine, 1991
 Jumnos roylei Hope, 1839
 Jumnos ruckeri Saunders, 1839

Cetoniinae
Taxa named by William Wilson Saunders